Frank Skinner (born 1957) is a British comedian.

Frank Skinner may also refer to:
Frank Skinner (composer) (1897–1968), American composer for motion pictures
Frank J. Skinner (1891–?), National Football League player
Frank Leith Skinner (1882–1967), Canadian plant breeder
Frank W. Skinner (1852–1932), American civil engineer, editor of the Engineering Record
Eddie Skinner (Frank E. Skinner, 1908–1987), American stock car driver